Dragster, released in 1980 for the Atari Video Computer System, is one of the first video games developed by Activision. It was programmed by David Crane, who later wrote Pitfall!. The objective of the game is to either beat the player's opponent across the screen or to race against the clock for best time, depending on the settings used. Dragster is an unauthorized adaptation of the 1977 Kee Games coin-op Drag Race.

Gameplay

The game can be played single or with two players. The goal is to reach the finish line in the shortest time possible. A countdown of few seconds introduces a round, during which the player may not shift gears or get disqualified for the round. At start, the player needs to accelerate and shift up to four gears.

Reception
Dragster was reviewed by Video magazine in its "Arcade Alley" column where it was described as having "an interesting premise" and as being "undeniably clever and, with a lot of patience, ... probably fun" but the reviewers also called it the "least" of Activision's early Atari 2600 releases. Specific criticism was given to the "clumsy" and "annoying" gameplay mechanics, and the game design was characterized as "ill-suited to the Atari control system".

The game sold over 500,000 copies.

World record and controversy
In 1982, Todd Rogers claimed the world record with a time of 5.51 seconds. Until January 29, 2018, this was accepted by Twin Galaxies and Guinness World Records, which later recognized it as the longest-standing video game record. Rogers said he achieved his time by shifting into second gear as the countdown timer reached zero. Eric Koziel, a speedrunner and creator of tool-assisted speedruns, analyzed the source code of the game, and it was discovered that 5.51 seconds was impossible. He did not find it possible to shift during the countdown and determined the best possible time to be 5.57.

On January 29, 2018, Twin Galaxies removed Todd Rogers' records and banned him from participating in their competitive leaderboards. Guinness World Records also removed him from its database.

The world record stands at 5.57 seconds, which has been achieved by multiple players.

See also

List of Atari 2600 games
List of Activision games: 1980–1999

References

External links
 Dragster at Atari Mania
 Dragster at Atari Age
 Dragster manual

1980 video games
Activision games
Atari 2600 games
Atari 2600-only games
North America-exclusive video games
Racing video games
Unauthorized video games
Video game clones
Video games developed in the United States